The 35th Iowa Infantry Regiment was an infantry regiment that served in the Union Army during the American Civil War.

Service
The 35th Iowa Infantry was organized at Muscatine, Iowa and mustered in for three years of Federal service on September 18, 1862.

The regiment was mustered out on August 10, 1865.

Total strength and casualties
A total of 1068 men served in the 35th Iowa at one time or another during its existence.
It suffered 5 officers and 44 enlisted men who were killed in action or who died of their wounds and 3 officers and 185 enlisted men who died of disease, for a total of 237 fatalities.

Commanders
 Colonel Sylvester G. Hill

See also
List of Iowa Civil War Units
Iowa in the American Civil War

Notes

References
The Civil War Archive

Units and formations of the Union Army from Iowa
Military units and formations established in 1862
1862 establishments in Iowa
Military units and formations disestablished in 1865